Byron Beck (born January 25, 1945) is an American former professional basketball player.

A 6 foot 9 inch forward/center from the University of Denver, Beck was one of six players (along with Louie Dampier, Gerald Govan, Bob Netolicky, Stew Johnson, and Freddie Lewis) who participated in all nine seasons (1967–1976) of the original American Basketball Association (ABA). He played for the Denver Rockets, who later became the Denver Nuggets.  Beck was not blessed with superior athleticism, but he was a hard worker known for his tenacious rebounding and efficient hook shot. He represented Denver in two ABA All-Star Games (1969 and 1976).

Beck also played one season in the National Basketball Association (NBA) after the Nuggets joined the NBA through the ABA–NBA merger in 1976, and he retired in 1977 with 8,603 career ABA/NBA points and 5,261 career rebounds.  On December 16, 1977, he became the first player in the Denver franchise to have his jersey number (#40) retired. In 1981, Beck was inducted into the Colorado Sports Hall of Fame.

After retiring from professional basketball, Beck moved to Kennewick, Washington where he worked as an engineer.

References

External links
Profile at Remember the ABA

1945 births
Living people
Amateur Athletic Union men's basketball players
American men's basketball players
Basketball players from Washington (state)
Centers (basketball)
Chicago Bulls draft picks
Columbia Basin College
Denver Nuggets players
Denver Pioneers men's basketball players
Denver Rockets players
Engineers from Washington (state)
Junior college men's basketball players in the United States
National Basketball Association players with retired numbers
People from Ellensburg, Washington
Power forwards (basketball)